The Reuleaux tetrahedron is the intersection of four balls of radius s centered at the vertices of a regular tetrahedron with side length s. The spherical surface of the ball centered on each vertex passes through the other three vertices, which also form vertices of the Reuleaux tetrahedron. Thus the center of each ball is on the surfaces of the other three balls. The Reuleaux tetrahedron has the same face structure as a regular tetrahedron, but with curved faces: four vertices, and four curved faces, connected by six circular-arc edges.

This shape is defined and named by analogy to the Reuleaux triangle, a two-dimensional curve of constant width; both shapes are named after Franz Reuleaux, a 19th-century German engineer who did pioneering work on ways that machines translate one type of motion into another. One can find repeated claims in the mathematical literature that the Reuleaux tetrahedron is analogously a surface of constant width, but it is not true: the two midpoints of opposite edge arcs are separated by a larger distance,

Volume and surface area
The volume of a Reuleaux tetrahedron is

The surface area is

Meissner bodies 

Ernst Meissner and Friedrich Schilling showed how to modify the Reuleaux tetrahedron to form a surface of constant width, by replacing three of its edge arcs by curved patches formed as the surfaces of rotation of a circular arc. According to which three edge arcs are replaced (three that have a common vertex or three that form a triangle) there result two noncongruent shapes that are sometimes called Meissner bodies or Meissner tetrahedra.

Bonnesen and Fenchel conjectured that Meissner tetrahedra are the minimum-volume three-dimensional shapes of constant width, a conjecture which is still open.  In connection with this problem, Campi, Colesanti and Gronchi showed that the minimum volume surface of revolution with constant width is the surface of revolution of a Reuleaux triangle through one of its symmetry axes.

One of Man Ray's paintings, Hamlet, was based on a photograph he took of a Meissner tetrahedron, which he thought of as resembling both Yorick's skull and Ophelia's breast from Shakespeare's Hamlet.

References

External links 

 
  There are also films and even interactive pictures of both Meissner bodies.
  Includes 3D pictures and link to mathematical paper showing proof of constant width.

Euclidean solid geometry
Geometric shapes
Constant width